Our Lady of the Rosary High School was a co-ed secondary school affiliated with the Archdiocese of Baltimore and located in Upper Fells Point in Baltimore, Maryland. The school closed in 2004 due to lack of funding.

References

External links
Our Lady of the Rosary High School at GreatSchools

Defunct Catholic secondary schools in Maryland
Defunct schools in Maryland
Educational institutions disestablished in 2004
Educational institutions in the United States with year of establishment missing
Private schools in Baltimore
Upper Fell's Point, Baltimore
2004 disestablishments in Maryland